Route 215, also known as Petit Forte Road, is a  east–west highway on the Burin Peninsula of the island of Newfoundland in the province of Newfoundland and Labrador. It connects the towns of Boat Harbour, Brookside, and Petit Forte with Route 210 (Heritage Run/Burin Peninsula Highway).

Route description

Route 215 begins just west of Boat Harbour at an intersection with Route 210 and heads east to immediately pass through the community. It now becomes very curvy and winding as it travels along the coastline through some hills to pass through Brookside before turning inland through remote terrain for several kilometres. The highway now dips to the south to follow the coast again as it enters Petite Forte and passes by a dock for a ferry leading to South East Bight. Route 215 passes through neighbourhoods before coming to an end shortly thereafter at the centre of town. As with most highways in Newfoundland and Labrador, it is entirely a two-lane road for its entire length.

Major intersections

References

215